Henry Kreisel, OC (June 5, 1922 – April 22, 1991) was a Canadian writer of novels and essays.

Kreisel was born in Vienna, Austria to a Polish-born mother and a Romanian-born father. The family, which was Jewish, managed to reach Britain just before the Second World War, but, like many other German-speaking refugees, they were declared enemy aliens after the war began.

In 1940 Kreisel was relocated to Canada. He lived on a farm in New Brunswick until 1941. It was there that he began his career as a writer, deciding to write in English and modelling himself on the bilingual author Joseph Conrad. After Canada decided to release the refugees from the camps they had been assigned to, Kreisel decided to pursue his dream of writing and was educated at the University of Toronto. He than denied any connection with or use of the German language, being the language of his persecutors.

Kreisel became one of the first Jewish writers to write about Jewish-Canadian issues. Later he spent time in Western Canada, and his essay "The Prairie: A State of Mind" is a frequently anthologized discussion of Western Canadian regionalism.

He was made an Officer of the Order of Canada in 1987. In order to honour him, the University of Alberta's Canadian Literature Centre in Edmonton organizes an annual "Henry Kreisel Memorial Lecture".

An inventory of his papers is existing at the University of Manitoba Archives & Special Collections.

Bibliography
 The Rich Man, 1948; reed. 1961, 2006
 The Betrayal, 1964
 The Betrayal, play, 1965 Canadian Broadcasting Corporation TV production
 The Prairie. A State of Mind, 1968 (= Transactions of the Royal Society of Canada, Vol. 6)
 The Almost Meeting, 1981
 Another Country: Writings by and about Henry Kreisel. Shirley Neumann ed., Edmonton 1985 (including: Diary of an internment, 1940 – 1941)
 Complete bibliography at athabascau.ca (and some essays about him)

Further reading
 Eden Robinson: The Sasquatch at home. Traditional protocols and modern storytelling. Ed. CLC, Canadian Literature Centre Edmonton, University of Alberta Press, Edmonton 2011  (Henry Kreisel memorial lecture series)

References
 Michael Greenstein: Close Encounters: Henry Kreisel's Short Stories, in Essays in Canadian Literature (Summer 1983), pp. 64–69
 Michael Greenstein: The Language of the Holocaust in "The Rich Man", in  Études canadiennes - Canadian Studies (1978), pp. 85–96
 Carolyn Hlus: Henry Kreisel, in Profiles in Canadian Literature, 5. Toronto: Dundurn Press, 1986
 Robert A. Lecker: State of Mind: Henry Kreisel's Novels, in Canadian Literature, Summer 1978, pp. 82–93
 Klaus Stierstorfer: Canadian recontextualization of a German nightmare: Henry Kreisel's "Betrayal" (1964), in Heinz Antor, Sylvia Brown ed.: Refractions of Germany in Canadian Literature and Culture. de Gruyter, Berlin 2003, repr. 2015, S. 195 - 206

External links
Henry Kreisel at The Canadian Encyclopedia
 Kreisel, item at English-Canadian Writers, Athabasca University, with more Weblinks (texts from and about Kreisel)

1922 births
1991 deaths
Canadian male short story writers
Jewish Canadian writers
Jewish emigrants from Austria to the United Kingdom after the Anschluss
University of Toronto alumni
Officers of the Order of Canada
Austrian emigrants to Canada
20th-century Canadian short story writers
20th-century Canadian male writers
People interned during World War II